James Luther "Luke" Sewell (January 5, 1901 – May 14, 1987) was an American professional baseball player, coach and manager. He played in Major League Baseball as a catcher  for the Cleveland Indians (1921–1932, 1939), Washington Senators (1933–1934), Chicago White Sox (1935–1938) and the St. Louis Browns (1942). Sewell batted and threw right-handed. He was regarded as one of the best defensive catchers of his era.

Baseball career
Born in the rural town of Titus, Alabama, Sewell grew up wanting to play baseball. He attended Wetumpka High School and graduated from the University of Alabama where, he played for the Alabama Crimson Tide baseball team as an infielder. He was linked to the Cleveland Indians because his brother Joe Sewell became their starting shortstop in 1920. When Indians scout Patsy Flaherty signed Sewell, he insisted that he play as a catcher. He began the 1921 season with the Columbus Senators in the American Association but, after only 17 minor league games, Sewell made his major league debut with the Cleveland Indians on June 30, 1921.

Sewell served as a reserve catcher, working behind Steve O'Neill until the 1923 season when O'Neill was injured in an auto accident. Sewell then played in a platoon role alongside Glenn Myatt, in which the left-hand hitting Myatt played the team's home games at League Park due to its 290-foot distance to the right field fence, while Sewell played the team's road games. Sewell eventually took over as the Indians number one catcher in the 1926 season, due to his superior defensive skills. He finished the year with only a .238 batting average but, led the American League catchers with 91 assists.

In 1927, Sewell had a breakout year, hitting for a career-high .294 batting average with 27 doubles, 53 runs batted in, and scored 52 runs. Sewell questioned Babe Ruth's integrity in a game on June 11, . He demanded that umpires check Ruth's bat after he clouted two straight home runs off Garland Buckeye. Although he led the league's catchers with 20 errors, he also led the league with 119 assists and 71 baserunners caught stealing. Despite the fact that the Indians finished the season in sixth place, Sewell ranked ninth in voting for the  American League Most Valuable Player Award. In 1928, he once again led the league's catchers with 117 assists and 60 baserunners caught stealing and ranked twelfth in voting for the  American League Most Valuable Player Award.

In 1933, Sewell was traded to the Washington Senators for catcher Roy Spencer. He posted career-highs with 125 hits including 30 doubles along with 61 runs batted in as, the Senators under first-year player-manager Joe Cronin, won 99 games to clinch the American League pennant by nine games over the New York Yankees. During a September game against the Yankees, Sewell made an odd double play. Lou Gehrig and Dixie Walker were on base when, Tony Lazzeri hit a ball to deep right field. Gehrig hesitated as he waited to see if the ball might be caught, before heading towards home plate with Walker right behind him. Sewell received the throw from the outfield and tagged both runners out with one sweeping motion. Cronin credited Sewell as a major factor in helping the Senators' pitching staff. The Senators eventually lost to the New York Giants in the 1933 World Series. In what would be his only postseason appearance, Sewell posted a .176 batting average (3 for 17), with one stolen base, one run scored, and one run batted in during the five-game series.

Sewell began the 1934 season with a hand injury and didn't play his first game until June 13. Two weeks later, he was struck in the head and knocked unconscious by a pitch thrown by St. Louis Browns pitcher, Bump Hadley. Sewell ended the season with a .237 batting average.

In January 1935, Sewell was traded to the St. Louis Browns, ironically for Bump Hadley. The Browns promptly traded him to the Chicago White Sox on the very same day. His offensive statistics improved with the White Sox, posting a .285 batting average with 67 runs batted in and, finished second among the league's catchers in assists and third in fielding percentage. In 1936, Sewell produced career-highs with 5 home runs and 73 runs batted in and, led American League catchers in assists and in baserunners caught stealing. By the first week of June 1937, Sewell had a .316 batting average to earn a spot as a reserve for the American League team in the 1937 All-Star Game. That year, he put up even better numbers than the consistently good ones he had been posting for a decade. On the season, he had a .269 batting average, with a .343 on-base percentage and six triples. Sewell finished the season ranked fifth in voting for the  American League Most Valuable Player Award.

Sewell's batting average dropped to .213 in 1938 and, in December of that year, he was purchased by the Brooklyn Dodgers for $7500. In April 1939, the 39-year-old Sewell was released by the Dodgers but, promptly signed a contract as a third-string catcher and pitching coach for the Cleveland Indians. The Indians hoped to groom him as an eventual replacement for manager Oscar Vitt who had fallen from the graces of General Manager Cy Slapnicka. He spent the 1940 season as a pitching coach but, when the Indians decided to hire Roger Peckinpaugh as their manager for the 1941 season, Sewell accepted the manager's position with the St. Louis Browns, replacing Fred Haney. Because of the shortage of major league players during the Second World War, Sewell served as a player-manager during the 1942 season, appearing in six games. He played his final game as a player on August 1,  at the age of 41.

Career statistics
In a 20-year major league career, Sewell played in 1,630 games, accumulating 1,393 hits in 5,383 at bats for a .259 career batting average along with 20 home runs, 698 runs batted in and an on-base percentage of .323. He retired with a .978 fielding percentage. As a catcher, Sewell had a strong throwing arm, leading the American League four times in baserunners caught stealing and four times in assists.

Even for the era, Sewell's low strikeout numbers were remarkable. Sewell held the American League record of 20 seasons as an active catcher until Carlton Fisk surpassed the record with 24 seasons as an active catcher with the Boston Red Sox (1969, 1971–80) and the Chicago White Sox (1981–93). He caught three no-hitters in his career; Wes Ferrell in 1931, Vern Kennedy in 1935, and Bill Dietrich in 1938. In his book, The Bill James Historical Baseball Abstract, baseball historian Bill James ranked Sewell as the fourth best catcher in the American League during his career. James ranked Mickey Cochrane, Bill Dickey and Rick Ferrell as the top three, all of whom were inducted into the Baseball Hall of Fame.

Sewell and his brother Joe, rank eighth on the all-time list of combined hits by brothers, with 3,619. Besides his brother, Joe Sewell, a Hall of Fame shortstop,  he had another brother named Tommy Sewell, who had one at-bat with the Chicago Cubs.

Managing career
After retiring as an active player, Sewell continued to manage the St. Louis Browns. He led them to the  American League pennant – the team's only championship in its 52 years in St. Louis, although they lost to the St. Louis Cardinals in the 1944 World Series. That year, he managed such players as Red Hayworth, Vern Stephens, and Jack Kramer, led them to an 89-65 record, and was awarded ''The Sporting News'" Manager of the Year Award. After a seventh-place finish in 1946, Sewell stepped down as the Browns' manager.

In January 1949 Sewell was hired as a pitching coach by the Cincinnati Reds and, in October of that year, he took over as the Reds' manager from Bucky Walters. After two unsuccessful seasons with the Reds, he resigned in July 1952 and was replaced by Rogers Hornsby. Sewell's major league managerial record was 606-644, a .485 winning percentage.

In December , Sewell was hired as manager of the Toronto Maple Leafs of the International League. He led the team to the league championship in his first season and won the International League Manager of the Year Award. Sewell led the Maple Leafs to a second-place finish in 1955. The team had a .622 winning percentage over his two years as manager. In November , he was named as the manager for the Seattle Rainiers of the Pacific Coast League. In August , Sewell was fired after one season in part due to player discontent over his managerial style.

Managerial record

See also
List of Major League Baseball player–managers

References

External links

Interview with Luke Sewell conducted by Eugene Murdock, March 31, 1974, in Akron, Ohio, in 2 parts (2 hours 15 minutes): Part 1 of 2, Part 2 of 2

1901 births
1987 deaths
Alabama Crimson Tide baseball players
Alabama Crimson Tide football players
American League All-Stars
Baseball coaches from Alabama
Baseball managers
Baseball players from Alabama
Chicago White Sox players
Cincinnati Reds coaches
Cincinnati Reds managers
Cleveland Indians coaches
Cleveland Indians players
Columbus Senators players
Deaths from cancer in Ohio
Deaths from colorectal cancer
Major League Baseball catchers
Major League Baseball pitching coaches
Major League Baseball player-managers
People from Elmore County, Alabama
St. Louis Browns managers
St. Louis Browns players
Baseball players from Akron, Ohio
Toronto Maple Leafs (International League) managers
University of Alabama alumni
Washington Senators (1901–1960) players